Peter Baptisto Germano (May 17, 1913 – September 20, 1983) was an American author of short stories, novels, and television scripts.  He began his career with short stories.  He wrote articles documenting the Marines in World War II as a combat correspondent.  He wrote novels, most of which were westerns, but also wrote science fiction.  And, as television became ever-present in American culture, Germano wrote numerous television scripts for western, science-fiction, drama, and cartoon series.

Biography

Early life
Germano was born in New Bedford, Massachusetts, the eldest of six children. His parents, Italian immigrants from the town of Cigliano, gave him the name Pietro Baptisto Germano, which became Peter B. early in his life. As a young man, he worked several jobs, including as a clerk for the local railroad. It was during his employment at the local train station that he met his wife, Muriel Garant. She was an actress and model, who worked in theater in Cape Cod, but took a job at the railroad station in New Bedford, Massachusetts during World War II. The couple married in February 1943, just before Germano left to serve in the Pacific Theater in World War II. He had a few short stories published in magazines before his tour of duty.

World War II
As a war correspondent for the United States Marine Corps, Germano wrote numerous articles that appeared in various newspapers. After the war Peter and Muriel lived in Chicago until he was called to serve in the Korean War in 1950. A few years later, the family settled in Anaheim, California (within walking distance to the newly opened Disneyland). Germano and his wife raised four children, while he began a successful writing career.

Education
Throughout his career in the military and his work as a writer, Germano went to college to receive two degrees. With only two years of high school, he attended Brown University in Providence, Rhode Island from 1946-1950. After his service in the Korean War, Germano transferred to Chapman College in Orange, California in 1956 and received a B. A. in 1959. In 1968, he attended Loyola Marymount University, where he earned his Master of Arts in 1970. From 1971-1973, Germano was a part-time lecturer at Loyola Marymount, where he taught Advanced Writing for Film and Television to graduate students.

Novels and television
With his transition from military to civilian life complete, Germano worked tirelessly on the bulk of his fiction career. He wrote western novels under several pseudonyms, and in the 1950s and 1960s wrote television scripts for several western and science fiction programs.
With a steady career, the family moved in 1966 to a new suburban home in Thousand Oaks, California, located north of Los Angeles in Ventura County. By the 1970s, he had published a science fiction novel, mystery short stories, and western short stories for the Jim Hatfield series in "Texas Rangers".

Germano collaborated with his wife, Muriel, on several projects. In the 1970s, he became the associate editor of The Californian, the newspaper of the Golden State Mobilehome Owners League. When the editor of the newspaper, Thomas Thompson, retired, Germano and his wife took over as editors; a position which they held for eight years. During this same time period, with grandchildren visiting often, the couple wrote scripts for several animated cartoons televisions series, including The Little Prince.

Memberships
A strong supporter of union labor, Germano was a member of the Writers Guild of America, West. He also held memberships to the Western Writers of America (which published "The Roundup" out of the University of Texas at El Paso), the Academy of Television Arts and Sciences, and the Marine Corps Combat Correspondents Association.

Death
Germano died in 1983. When not writing, he hiked the golden hills of California. His ashes were spread in the hills near Thousand Oaks. Memorials for both Peter and Muriel Germano are located in Simi Valley's Assumption Cemetery, the local Catholic cemetery.

Filmography

Television

Novels
Written as Barry Cord
 Trail Boss From Texas (1948)
 The Gunsmoke Trail (1951)   
 Shadow Valley (1951) 
 Mesquite Johnny (1952) 
 Savage Valley (1957)
 Trail to Sundown (1953)
 Cain Basin (1954) 
 The Sagebrush Kid (1954)     
 Boss of Barbed Wire (1955) 
 Dry Range (1955) (issued as The Rustlers of Dry Range (1956) in UK)
 The Guns of Hammer (1956) 
 The Gun-Shy Kid (1957)
 The Prodigal Gun (1957)  
 Sheriff of Big Hat (1957)   
 Concho Valley (1958) 
 Gun-Proddy Hombre (1958) 
 The Iron Trail Killers (1959)
 Last Chance at Devil's Canyon (1959)
 Maverick Gun (1959)
 The Third Rider (1959)
 Six Bullets Left (1959)
 Starlight Range (1959) (reissued as Slade (1961) )
 War in Peaceful Valley (1959)
 Two Guns to Avalon (1962) 
 The Masked Gun (1963)   
 A Ranger Called Solitary (1966)  
 Canyon Showdown (1967) 
 Gallows Ghost (1967)  
 Last Stage to Gomorrah (1967)
 The Long Wire (1968)   
 Trouble in Peaceful Valley (1968) 
 The Coffin Fillers (1972)
 Hell in Paradise Valley (1972)  
 Desert Knights (1973) 
 The Running Iron Samaritans (1973) 
 Deadly Amigos: Two Graves For A Gunman (1979) 
 Gun Junction (1979)  
 Boss of the Tumbling H (1995, Black Horse Western) (Originally appeared in the magazine West in May 1948).

Written as James Kane
 Gunman's Choice (1960)  
 Renegade Ranger (1963) Issued by Muller
 The Doublecross Gun (1970)
 Last Gun to Jericho (1970)(A rewrite of Texas Rangers' "Riot at Hell's Bend" (December, 1955) ).
 Four Graves West (1971)
 Texas Warrior (1971) 
 Brassada Hill (1972)

Written as Jim Kane
 Renegade Rancher (1961)  
 Gunman's Choice (1962) 
 Spanish Gold (1963) 
 Tangled Trails (1963)  
 Lost Canyon (1964)  
 Red River Sheriff (1965)  
 Rendezvous at Bitter Wells (1966)

Written as Jack Slade
 A Hell of a Way to Die 
 The Man from Lordsburg (1970)
 Gunfight at Ringo Junction  (1971) 
 The Man from Tombstone  (1971)
 Funeral Bend  (1973)
 Sidewinder  (1973)
 Five Graves for Lassiter (1979)
 The Man from Yuma  (1982)

Written as Jack Bertin
 The Interplanetary Adventures (1970)  
 The Pyramids from Space (1977)

References

External links
The Work of Peter B. Germano

University of Oregon Library, Guide to Western fiction writers in Manuscript collections

20th-century American novelists
American male novelists
American male screenwriters
Loyola Marymount University alumni
Brown University alumni
People from New Bedford, Massachusetts
Novelists from Massachusetts
1913 births
1983 deaths
Chapman University alumni
American male short story writers
20th-century American short story writers
20th-century American male writers
Screenwriters from Massachusetts
20th-century American screenwriters